Satrangi Peengh 3 is the studio album by Harbhajan Mann & Gursewak Mann released on 27 September 2017.

Track listing

References

Punjabi albums